Stoke Gifford is a village and parish in South Gloucestershire, England. It had around 11,000 residents at the 2001 census, increasing to 15,494 at the 2011 census and then to 19,794 in the 2021 Census. 

It is served by Bristol Parkway railway station and is home to Stoke Gifford depot, on the London-South Wales railway line. As well as the Bristol offices of Aviva which took over Friends Life in 2015, Hewlett Packard and the University of the West of England. The parish includes neighbouring Little Stoke, Harry Stoke and Stoke Park. The parish borders Filton, to the south-west, Patchway to the north west, Bradley Stoke to the north and Winterbourne and Hambrook to the east. To the south Stoke Gifford is served by the Bristol Ring Road, south of this a large green area known as the 'Green Lung' stretches to the inner city area of St Werburghs.

Descent of the manor

Giffard
Following the Norman Invasion of 1066, William the Conqueror gave the manor of Stoke Gifford to Osbern Giffard, one of his knights. Giffard himself was a native of Longueville-le-Giffard, Normandy, now known as Longueville-sur-Scie, from which the 'Gifford' suffix derives. The 'Stoke' part of the name may come from the Stoke Brook, or may also be a reference to the Saxon word 'Stoche' meaning 'property of or dependent farmstead'. Bradley Stoke and Stoke Lodge, both 20th-century estates, were also given the name.
Extensive histories of Stoke Gifford can be found online.

Berkeley

The manor remained in the Giffard family until 1337, when it was granted to Maurice de Berkeley (died 1347), 2nd son of Maurice de Berkeley, 2nd Baron Berkeley (1271–1326). Thus was founded the long and distinguished cadet branch of "Berkeley of Stoke Gifford". In 1553 a new late-Tudor manor house was built by Sir Richard Berkeley (died 1604), 7th in descent from Maurice de Berkeley (died 1347). It became known as Stoke Park, and was rebuilt in 1750 by Norborne Berkeley, 4th Baron Botetourt (died 1770), from a neo-classical design by Thomas Wright.

Governance
The area falls in the Stoke Gifford electoral ward. This ward starts in the east at Winterbourne. The total population of the ward taken at the 2011 census was 15,494.

Local amenities
The Church of England parish church of St Michael's is a Grade II* listed building.

The church runs a pre-school nursery in the old vicarage, and a small coffee shop in the Old School Rooms across The Green from the church, which backs onto Parkway railway station. Also in the local area are two parks, each with children's play equipment; a pair of tennis courts and a pub, the Beaufort Arms.  There is a row of shops on Ratcliffe Drive including a Tesco Express, dentist and medical centre and few more shops on one of the roads off North Road. There are several large supermarkets within walking distance and most of the local children walk or cycle to nearby St Michael's C of E Primary School & Abbeywood Community School.

Stoke Gifford Parish Council provoked national interest and condemnation in April 2016 when they resolved to charge parkrun runners a fee to use a park, resulting in the closure of the event in June 2016.

Stoke Gifford Cricket Club in 2018 won the Bristol & District 30 over cricket league.

Expansion in the 20th century
Like much of the nearby area, Stoke Gifford undertook rapid expansion in the 20th century. Before the 1980s Stoke Gifford was just a small village, straggling along the main street, North Road.

The Old School Rooms hosts the Explorer Scouts, Scouts, Cub Scouts, Beaver Scouts and Brownies.

St Michael's School was praised in the December 2008 report as "...a good school...the care, guidance and support for pupils is outstanding."

In 2008, a new pre-school and Nursery opened adjacent to Bristol Parkway because of population increases in the surrounding areas.

Bristol Technology and Engineering Academy, a university technical college, opened in Stoke Gifford in September 2013. It merged with Abbeywood Community School in September 2022.

References

External links

Stoke Gifford parish council
The History of Stoke Gifford

Villages in South Gloucestershire District
Civil parishes in Gloucestershire